To be wooden is to be made of the hard, fibrous, lignified structural tissue produced as secondary xylem in the stems of woody plants.

Wooden may also refer to:

People
 Charles Wooden (1827–1875), German recipient of the Victoria Cross
 Colby Wooden (born 2000), American football player
 John Wooden (1910–2010), American college basketball coach
 Josh Wooden (born 1978), Australian rules footballer
 Shawn Wooden (American football) (born 1973), American football safety
 Shawn Wooden (politician), American politician

Other uses
 17241 Wooden, a main-belt asteroid
 Wooden language, a diverting of attention from reality by using certain words

See also